is a railway station in the city of Yurihonjō, Akita Prefecture,  Japan, operated by the third-sector  railway operator Yuri Kōgen Railway.

Lines
Kurosawa Station is served by the Chōkai Sanroku Line, and is located 9.5 kilometers from the terminus of the line at Ugo-Honjō Station.

Station layout
The station has one side platform, serving one bi-directional track. The station is unattended.

Adjacent stations

History
On that date, it was elevated to a full station, named . The JGR became the Japan National Railway (JNR) after World War II. The station has been unattended since October 1971. The Yashima Line was privatized on 1 October 1985, becoming the Yuri Kōgen Railway Chōkai Sanroku Line, at which time the station assumed its present name. A new station building was completed in December 2003.

Surrounding area

See also
List of railway stations in Japan

External links

Railway stations in Japan opened in 1937
Railway stations in Akita Prefecture
Yurihonjō